KVTS (107.9 FM) is a radio station broadcasting a religious format. Licensed to Republic, Missouri, United States, it serves the Springfield MO area on a LPFM signal that can be heard within the southern portions of Greene County.  The station is currently owned by Calvary Chapel of Republic.

External links
 

VTS